Chouliarades (Greek: Χουλιαράδες) is a village in the municipality of North Tzoumerka, Greece. Its population was 140 people (2011 census).  It is a traditional settlement since November 23, 1998 (Law 908D) and its code number is 12317201. The village is well known for its singing tradition: one of the villagers, Gakis Sontis, was recorded in 1930 by the Folklore Music Archive of Melpo Merlie.

Geography
The village is built on the slopes of the Tzoumerka or Athamanio mountains at 1,000 m. It is 19 km southeast of Ioannina, 2.5 km west of Vaptistis and 2.5 km south of Petrovouni.

Population

See also
List of settlements in the Ioannina regional unit

References

External links
Chouliarades at the GTP Travel Pages
  Folklore Council in the village of Houliarades, in Tzoumerka (then with the Dodona subprefecture or province) in the Ioannina Prefecture
 History of Chouliarades

Populated places in Ioannina (regional unit)